Terpsi (Greek: Τέρψη, meaning "pleasure") is a neighbourhood in the city of Patras.  The settlement was created in 1945 a little higher than Chalkomata. The area used to be vineyards.  It received the name from the homonymous street there.

Bounding neighbourhood

Chalkomata

References
The first version of the article is translated and is based from the article at the Greek Wikipedia (el:Main Page)

Neighborhoods in Patras